Diyarbakır railway station is the main railway station in the city of Diyarbakır, Turkey. TCDD Taşımacılık operates the Southern Kurtalan Express to Ankara or Kurtalan and a daily regional train to Batman.

The station was built by the Turkish State Railways in 1935 as part of the railway from Fevzipaşa. The station building was built in the Art Deco style, similar to the station buildings of Sivas, Manisa and Malatya.

Diyarbakır station consists of one side platform and one island platform serving three tracks. A freight yard is also present on the station grounds.

See also
Sivas station
Malatya station
Manisa station

References

External links
Station information
Station timetable

Railway stations in Diyarbakır Province
Railway stations opened in 1935
1935 establishments in Turkey
Art Deco railway stations